Thornton is an unincorporated community in Whitman County, Washington, United States. Thornton had a post office with ZIP code 99176.

References

Unincorporated communities in Whitman County, Washington
Unincorporated communities in Washington (state)